Windstorm is the fourth studio album released by Gloria Jones in 1978. This album was a dedication to Marc Bolan, as on the rear cover, is written: "Special Dedication in memory of my son's father, the late Marc Bolan, whom we miss very much."

Track listing
"Bring on the Love (Why Can't We Be Friends)" (Gloria Jones, Richard Jones, Suzanne DePasse, Tony Jones)
"Windstorm" (Lawrence Hill, Richard Jones)
"If The Roses Don't Come (In Spring This Year)" (Addison Terry, Gloria Jones, Raymond Gibson)
"Blue Light Microphone" (Kevin Beverly, Richard Jones)
"Hooked on You Baby" (Kevin Beverly, Richard Jones)
"Vaya Con Dios (May God Be with You)" (Buddy Pepper, Inez James, Larry Russell)
"Kiss Me, Kiss Me, Kiss Me (Don't Say Goodbye)" (Lawrence Hill, Richard Jones)
"Woman Is a Woman" (Lawrence Hill, Richard Jones)

Personnel
Gloria Jones - vocals
Melvin "Wah Wah" Watson, Ray Parker Jr. - guitar
Joe Sample - keyboards
Paul Humphrey - drums
Eddie "Bongo" Brown, Jack Ashford - percussion

References 

1978 albums
Gloria Jones albums
Capitol Records albums